A Fool To Care is the eighteenth studio album by American singer-songwriter Boz Scaggs. It was released in the US on March 31, 2015, and in the UK on March 30, 2015, on 429 Records. The album was the second in a three-album series celebrating American roots music (Memphis being released in 2013 and Out of the Blues in 2018). The front cover was by Danny Clinch who photographed Scaggs in Conzelman Road, Sausalito, California.

Critical reception 
Rolling Stone writes, "These 12 songs map out a concise history of American soul, with a heavy dose of New Orleans strut... Backed throughout by a stellar group of studio aces — guitarist Ray Parker Jr., bassist Willie Weeks and drummer Steve Jordan, who also produced the album — Scaggs’ well-worn, textured voice deftly navigates this range of styles."

Blues Rock Review writes, "On each song, Scaggs puts his decades of experience and emotional connections to American roots music to work, producing a collection that stands as one of this year’s best blues records to date."

Track listing 

Bonus Tracks

Personnel 

 Boz Scaggs – lead vocals, rhythm guitar (1, 3), guitar (2, 5, 8, 9, 15), acoustic guitar (4, 14), electric guitar (4), guitar fills (10), bass (14), vibraphone (14)
 Al Anderson – guitar figure (1), "chunk" guitar (3)
 Ray Parker Jr. – guitar (2, 5–11, 13), rhythm guitar (3), acoustic guitar (4), electric guitar (12)
 Bonnie Raitt – slide guitar (3), lead and harmony vocals (3)
 Paul Franklin – steel guitar (6, 12)
 Reggie Young – guitar (10, 11, 13)
 Jim Cox – Hammond B3 organ (1, 4, 6–8, 10, 11), acoustic piano (2–6, 9, 11), pump organ (6), Wurlitzer electric piano (7), Rhodes (13)
 Seth Asarnow – bandoneon (4, 5, 8), pump organ (11)
 Clifford Carter – synthesizers (6)
 Michael Anthony Logan, Sr. – keyboards (15), programming (15), drums (15)
 Willie Weeks – bass (1–13, 15)
 Steve Jordan – drums (1-13), percussion (4, 5, 8), backing vocals (7, 8), horn conductor (10)
 Michael Rodriguez – drum programming (14)
 Jim Hoke – baritone saxophone (1, 2), bass clarinet (2, 8), accordion (4, 6), vibraphone (5, 7, 8), woodwind (5), woodwind arrangements (5), alto flute (8)
 Eric Crystal – alto saxophone (1, 2, 8), tenor saxophone (1, 2, 8), acoustic piano (8), saxophone (14)
 Doug Rowan – tenor saxophone (1, 8), alto saxophone (2)
 Lannie McMillan – tenor saxophone (10)
 Jack Hale – trombone (10)
 Ben Cauley – trumpet (10)
 Quentin Ware – trumpet (10)
 Lester Snell – horn arrangements (10), string arrangements and conductor (10, 11, 13)
 Anthony LaMarchina – cello (10, 11, 13)
 Sarighani Reist – cello (10, 11, 13)
 Monisa Angell – viola (10, 11, 13)
 Kristin Wilkinson – viola (10, 11, 13)
 David Angell – violin (10, 11, 13)
 Wei Tsun Chang – violin (10, 11, 13)
 David Davidson – violin (10, 11, 13)
 Alicia Enstrom – violin (10, 11, 13)
 Tony Lindsay – backing vocals (7, 9, 11)
 Conesha Monét Owens – backing vocals (7, 9, 11)
 Fred Ross – backing vocals (7, 9, 11)
 Lucinda Williams – lead and harmony vocals (12)

Production 

 Steve Jordan – producer, mixing (1)
 Niko Bolas – engineer, mixing (2-13)
 Dave O'Donnell – mixing (1)
 Michael Rodriguez – additional engineer
 Chris Taberez – additional engineer, mixing (14, 15)
 Sean Badum – assistant engineer 
 Diego Ruelas – assistant engineer 
 Bernie Grundman – mastering 
 Jeri Heiden – art direction, design 
 Nick Steinhardt – art direction, design 
 Danny Clinch – photography
 
 Studios 
 Recorded at Blackbird Studio (Nashville, Tennessee) and The Barn (Napa Valley, California).
 Mixed at Capitol Studios (Hollywood, California).
 Mastered at Bernie Grundman Mastering (Hollywood, California).

References 

2015 albums
Boz Scaggs albums
Albums produced by Boz Scaggs